Linus Fagemo (born March 5, 1977) is a Swedish former professional ice hockey winger who played in the Elitserien for Frölunda HC, Timra IK, Luleå HF and Malmö Redhawks.

Personal life
Fagemo's son, Samuel Fagemo, currently plays for the Frölunda HC in the Swedish Hockey League.

References

External links

1977 births
Living people
Arizona Sundogs players
Borås HC players
Frölunda HC players
Herning Blue Fox players
Iserlohn Roosters players
Luleå HF players
Malmö Redhawks players
Swedish ice hockey left wingers
Timrå IK players
IF Troja/Ljungby players
People from Trollhättan
Sportspeople from Västra Götaland County